Ingrid Stengård (born 31 July 1975) is a Finnish mountain bike orienteering competitor. She won two individual bronze medals at the 2006 World MTB Orienteering Championships, and won gold medals with the Finnish relay team in 2007 and 2008.

References

Finnish orienteers
Female orienteers
Finnish female cyclists
Mountain bike orienteers
Living people
1975 births
Place of birth missing (living people)
Finnish mountain bikers